Stage 5 (or, originally, "Stage V") is an unofficial stage at the Walnut Valley Festival, an annual bluegrass festival in Winfield, Kansas, United States.

Set up in the Pecan Grove campground, the informal stage began in 1987 when camper Russell Brace and friends built it on the back of a 1954 Chevrolet 4100 1-1/2 ton flatbed truck.  The stage is so-named because the festival proper has four main stages.

The stage was immediately popular and is now a cherished tradition at the annual event.  

Audiences at Stage 5 can usually expect to hear typical acoustic string instruments.  However, many musicians, while there, part from traditional bluegrass styles and emphasize a looser, more rock-oriented interpretation of roots music.

Several notables have played Stage 5.  Among them: Tommy Emmanuel, The Wilders, Bodhi Linde, Beppe Gambetta, an early incarnation of the The Chicks, and Split Lip Rayfield.

See also 
List of bluegrass music festivals
List of folk festivals

References

External links

Stage 5 website
Folk festivals in the United States
Music festivals in Kansas
Bluegrass festivals
Music festivals established in 1987